The South American Men's Club Handball Championship, organized by the Pan-American Team Handball Federation, was the official competition for men's handball clubs of South Americas, and takes place every year. In addition to crowning the Pan American champions, the tournament also served as a qualifying tournament for the IHF Super Globe. In 2003 or 2004 it was folded because of the dominance of the Brazilian teams. In 2007 the Pan American Men's Club Handball Championship was created.

Summary

Medal table

Per Club

Per Nation

References

External links
 www.panamhandball.org

Handball
Pan-American Team Handball Federation competitions
Men's handball competitions
Recurring sporting events established in 1983
Recurring sporting events disestablished in 2004